Uwe Jansen is a rugby league coach, administrator and former player.

Jansen played for Germany against Estonia in 2006, scoring a try in the 24–38 win.

Jansen coached Germany in four matches, winning three. In the 2008 season he was co-coach of the national side alongside Dan Stocks and also coached the Rohrbach Hornets. Dan Stocks then took over as coach in 2009.

Jansen is currently one of Rugby League Deutschland's board members.

References

German rugby league coaches
German rugby league players
Germany national rugby league team coaches
Germany national rugby league team players
Living people
Place of birth missing (living people)
Rugby league administrators
Year of birth missing (living people)